The 2009–10 Cornell Big Red men's basketball team represented Cornell University in the 2009–10 college basketball season. This was coach Steve Donahue's tenth season at Cornell. The Big Red compete in the Ivy League and played their home games at Newman Arena. They went 13–1 in Ivy League play to win the championship for the third year in a row and received the league's automatic bid to the 2010 NCAA Division I men's basketball tournament. They earned a 12 seed in the East Region. They upset 5 seed and AP #12 Temple in the first round for the first tournament win in school history. They continued their success by upsetting 4 seed and AP #16 Wisconsin to advance to their first Sweet Sixteen where they lost to 1 seed and AP #2 Kentucky to finish their season at 29–5.

Roster
Source

Schedule and results
Source
All times are Eastern

|-
!colspan=9| Regular Season

|-
!colspan=10| 2010 NCAA Division I men's basketball tournament

Rankings

*AP does not release post-NCAA Tournament rankings^Coaches did not release a Week 2 poll.

Awards and honors
Ryan Wittman – Ivy League Player of the Year, Honorable Mention AP All-American

References

Cornell
Cornell Big Red men's basketball seasons
Cornell
Cornell
Cornell